is a city in Kagoshima Prefecture, Japan. It is located in the southeastern Kyushu region in the central part of Ōsumi Peninsula.

Kanoya is the most populous city in Japan without any connection to railway services, after the abolition of the Ōsumi Line in 1987.

Geography 
The Takakuma Mountains stretch out into the northwestern part of the city and the Kimotsuki Mountains in the southeast. Between both mountain ranges lie the Kasanohara and Kanoyahara plateaus. The Kimotsuki Plains spread through the alluvial plains of the Kimotsuki River that runs through central Kanoya. In the western part of the city is Kinko Bay which runs down the coast line.

Bordering municipalities 
Kanoya is bordered by the cities of Tarumizu, Kirishima, and Soo, the towns of Higashikushira, Kinko, and Kimotsuki in Kimotsuki District, and the town of Osaki in Soo District.

Climate
Kanoya has a humid subtropical climate (Köppen climate classification Cfa) with hot summers and mild winters. Precipitation is significant throughout the year, and is heavier in summer, especially the months of June and July.

Demographics
, the city has an estimated population of 104,148. Within Kagoshima Prefecture, Kanoya is the third most populous city next to Kagoshima (the prefectural capital) and Kirishima.

In 2006, the original city of Kanoya was expanded following the merger of the two towns of Aira and Kushira in Kimotsuki District, and Kihoku in Soo District. The original Kanoya City was established as a municipality on May 27, 1941 (Navy Memorial Day).

Kanoya is also popularly called the "Town of Roses".

Specialties
Kanoya's specialties include Berkshire pig, peanuts, broilers, and sweet potatoes. Kanoya is home to the Kanoya National Institute of Fitness and Sports (NIFS), as well as the Japan Maritime Self-Defense Force Kanoya Air Base (JMSDF Kanoya Air Field).

Education
National Institute of Fitness and Sports in Kanoya

Notable people from Kanoya, Kagoshima
 Sunshine Ikezaki (Real Name: Satoru Ikezaki, Nihongo: 池崎 慧, Ikezaki Satoru), Japanese comedian
 Yuka Nishida (Nihongo: 西田 優香, Nishida Yuka), Japanese judoka
 Sayuri Kokushō (Nihongo: 国生さゆり or 國生さゆり, Kokusho Sayuri), Japanese actress, singer, and tarento
 Taiga Satoru (Real Name: Satoshi Kawasaki, Nihongo: 川崎悟司, Kawasaki Satoshi), Japanese sumo wrestler
 Yamato Maeda (Nihongo: 前田 大和, Maeda Yamato), Japanese professional baseball outfielder (Yokohama DeNA BayStars, Nippon Professional Baseball)
 Sakura Yokomine (Nihongo: 横峯さくら, Yokomine Sakura), Japanese professional golfer (LPGA Tour and LPGA of Japan Tour)

References

External links

 
 Kanoya International Exchange Association 
 

Kanoya, Kagoshima
Cities in Kagoshima Prefecture